Inam Asur is a village in the Kumbakonam taluk of Thanjavur district, Tamil Nadu, India.

Demographics 

As per the 2001 census, Inam Asur had a total population of 519 with 248 males and 271 females. The sex ratio was 1093. The literacy rate was 78.51.

References 

 

Villages in Thanjavur district